Paul-Louis Boutié (1910-2004) was a French art director who designed the sets for many film productions in postwar France cinema.

Selected filmography
 Beautiful Star (1938)
 The Acrobat (1941)
 Gringalet (1946)
 Lessons in Conduct (1946)
 The Sea Rose (1946)
 Six Hours to Lose (1947)
 After Love (1948)
 The White Night (1948)
 The King (1949)
 Marlene (1949)
 Two Loves (1949)
 Rendezvous in Grenada (1951)
 Monsieur Leguignon, Signalman (1952)
 My Brother from Senegal (1953)
 The Last Robin Hood (1953)
 The Sleepwalker (1951)
 The Ostrich Has Two Eggs (1957)
 Fugitive in Saigon (1957)
 The Seventh Commandment (1957)
 Thérèse Étienne (1958)
 Eyes of Love (1959)
 The Fenouillard Family (1961)
 Taxi for Tobruk (1961)
 Le Masque de fer (1962)
 OSS 117 Mission for a Killer (1965)
 Diamonds Are Brittle (1965)
 The Gardener of Argenteuil (1966)

References

Bibliography
 Coates-Smith, Michael & McGee, Garry. The Films of Jean Seberg. McFarland, 2014.

External links

1910 births
2004 deaths
French art directors
People from Essonne